John Annear (born 17 June 1961) is a former Australian rules footballer who played for Collingwood, Richmond and West Coast in the Victorian Football League (VFL) during the 1980s.

Annear began his career in Western Australia with Claremont and played 62 West Australian Football League games over three years before being recruited by Collingwood. He was used as a midfielder and played his best football at Richmond, where in 1984 he finished second in their best and fairest.  Andrew Demetriou (subsequently CEO of the Australian Football League from 2003 to 2014) was suspended in that year for striking Annear.

In 1987 he crossed to West Coast who were competing in their inaugural VFL season and was their second most experienced player behind Ross Glendinning. He made State of Origin appearances for Western Australia towards the end of the decade.

References

Holmesby, Russell and Main, Jim (2007). The Encyclopedia of AFL Footballers. 7th ed. Melbourne: Bas Publishing.

1961 births
Living people
Australian rules footballers from Western Australia
Claremont Football Club players
Collingwood Football Club players
Richmond Football Club players
West Coast Eagles players
South Fremantle Football Club players
Western Australian State of Origin players